The Coastal Classic is a passenger and semi-luxury train operated by the Alaska Railroad between the cities of Anchorage and Seward, Alaska. It is a seasonal train, only operating between the months of May and September. Despite its seasonality, the Coastal Classic was the Alaska Railroad's most popular route in 2019.

In 2020, summer services began in July in response to the COVID-19 pandemic.

Station Stops 
The Coastal Classic makes the following station stops:

Anchorage
Girdwood
Seward

References

External links 

Passenger trains of the Alaska Railroad
Passenger rail transportation in Alaska
Named passenger trains of the United States